A wide range of research methods are used in psychology. These methods vary by the sources from which information is obtained, how that information is sampled, and the types of instruments that are used in data collection. Methods also vary by whether they collect qualitative data, quantitative data or both.

Qualitative psychological research findings are not arrived at by statistical or other quantitative procedures. Quantitative psychological research findings result from mathematical modeling and statistical estimation or statistical inference. The two types of research differ in the methods employed, rather than the topics they focus on.

There are three main types of psychological research:

 Correlational research
 Descriptive research
 Experimental research

Common methods
Common research designs and data collection methods include:

 Archival research
 Case study uses different research methods (e.g. interview, observation, self-report questionnaire) with a single case or small number of cases.
 Computer simulation (modeling)
 Ethnography 
 Event sampling methodology, also referred to as experience sampling methodology, diary study, or ecological momentary assessment
 Experiment, often with separate treatment and control groups (see scientific control and design of experiments). See Experimental psychology for many details.
 Field experiment
 Focus group
 Interview, can be structured or unstructured.
 Meta-analysis
 Neuroimaging and other psychophysiological methods
 Observational study, can be naturalistic (see natural experiment), participant or controlled.
 Program evaluation
 Quasi-experiment
 Self-report inventory
 Survey, often with a random sample (see survey sampling)
 Twin study

Research designs vary according to the period(s) of time over which data are collected:

 Retrospective cohort study: Participants are chosen, then data are collected about their past experiences.
 Prospective cohort study: Participants are recruited prior to the proposed independent effects being administered or occurring.
 Cross-sectional study: A population is sampled on all proposed measures at one point in time.
 Longitudinal study: Participants are studied at multiple time points. May address the cohort effect and help to indicate causal directions of effects.
 Cross-sequential study: Groups of different ages are studied at multiple time points; combines cross-sectional and longitudinal designs

Research in psychology has been conducted with both animals and human subjects:

 Animal study
 Human subject research

References 
 Stangor, C. (2007). Research Methods for the Behavioral Sciences. 3rd ed. Boston, MA: Houghton Mifflin Company.
 Weathington, B.L., Cunningham, C.J.L., & Pittenger, D.P.  (2010). Research Methods for the Behavioral and Social Sciences. Hoboken, NJ: John Wiley & Sons, Inc.

Research methods
Cognitive science lists
Research-related lists
Quantitative psychology